Mandaic is a Unicode block containing characters of the Mandaic script used for writing the historic Eastern Aramaic, also called Classical Mandaic, and the modern Neo-Mandaic language.

History
The following Unicode-related documents record the purpose and process of defining specific characters in the Mandaic block:

Typefaces
Mandaic typefaces developed by Ardwan Alsabti include:

Mandaicana (2011), one of the first Mandaic typefaces
Ardwan Malka (2011)
Englaiscana (2011)
Ardwan Lidzbarski (2018), based on the Mandaic handwriting of Mark Lidzbarski
Ardwan Manuscript (2019), a cursive font based on the handwriting of Mandaic manuscripts
Ardwan Drower (2021), based on the Mandaic handwriting of E. S. Drower

References 

Unicode blocks
Mandaic language